Pamborus is a genus of beetles in the family Carabidae, containing the following species:

 Pamborus alternans Latreille, 1817
 Pamborus brisbanensis Castelnau, 1867
 Pamborus cooloolensis Takami & Sota, 2006
 Pamborus elegans Sloane, 1904
 Pamborus euopacus Takami & Sota, 2006
 Pamborus guerini Gory, 1830
 Pamborus macleayi Castelnau, 1867
 Pamborus monteithi Takami & Sota, 2006
 Pamborus moorei Takami & Sota, 2006
 Pamborus opacus Gehin, 1885
 Pamborus pradieri Chaudoir, 1869
 Pamborus punctatus Darlington, 1961
 Pamborus sedlaceki Coussement
 Pamborus subtropicus Darlington, 1961
 Pamborus transitus Darlington, 1961
 Pamborus tropicus Darlington, 1961
 Pamborus viridis Gory, 1836

References

Carabinae
Carabidae genera